"You Got Me" is a single by German singer Ivy Quainoo. It was released as a Digital download in Germany on June 7, 2012 as the second single from her debut studio album Ivy (2012). The song was written by S. Mones, J. Forster, S. Granger and produced by Marek Pompetzki, Paul NZA, Cecil Remmler.

Track listing

Credits and personnel
 Lead vocals – Ivy Quainoo
 Producers – Marek Pompetzki, Paul NZA, Cecil Remmler
 Lyrics – S. Mones, J. Forster, S. Granger
 Label: Universal Music

Chart performance

Weekly charts

Release history

References

2012 singles
Ivy Quainoo songs
2012 songs
Universal Music Group singles